Levi Parsons Powers (May 9, 1828 – September 24, 1888) was an American politician and lawyer.

Born in Marshfield, Vermont, Powers moved to Grand Rapids, Wisconsin in 1853, where he worked in logging and studied law. Powers was admitted to the Wisconsin Bar in 1853. Powers became the political editor of the Grand Rapids Tribune when it was established in 1873. He served as county clerk and as county judge. Powers served in the Wisconsin State Assembly in 1863. He died in Wisconsin Rapids, Wisconsin.

Notes

1828 births
1888 deaths
People from Washington County, Wisconsin
People from Wisconsin Rapids, Wisconsin
Editors of Wisconsin newspapers
County clerks in Wisconsin
Wisconsin state court judges
Members of the Wisconsin State Assembly
People from Grand Rapids, Wisconsin
19th-century American politicians
19th-century American judges